Rederi Ab Sally was a Finnish shipping company founded in 1937 by Algot Johansson. Originally a tanker operator, Sally became a dominant member of the Viking Line shipping consortium in the 1970s. The company met bad times in the 1980s and was bought by its rivals Effoa and Johnson Line (owners of Silja Line) in 1987. In 1990 the operations of Sally, Effoa and Johnson Line were merged into EffJohn and Rederi Ab Sally ceased to exist as an independent company.

Subsidiaries
During its history Rederi Ab Sally was involved in operating tankers, ferries, cruiseferries and cruise ships. It fully or partially owned numerous subsidiaries, including:

Rederi Ab Vikinglinjen / Rederi Ab Solstad - founded in 1959, Rederi Ab Sally majority of stocks in 1963, merged into Rederi Ab Sally in the 1970s.
Commodore Cruise Line - bought in 1980.
Sally Line UK - founded in 1981.
Vaasanlaivat / Vasabåtarna - bought from Enso-Gutzeit in 1982.
Sally Cruise - founded in 1985, traffic started 1986.
Ånedin Linjen - purchased in 1986.

Rederi Ab Sally was also a partner in the Viking Line consortium from its founding in 1966 until 1987, when Sally was bought by the owners of Viking Line's main rivals Silja Line, and the other Viking Line partners Rederi AB Slite and SF Line forced Sally to withdraw from the consortium.

References

External links
Sally & Silja discussion at FCBS forum (in Finnish)
Commodore Cruise Lines at Simplon Postcards
Rederi Ab Vikinglinjen at Maritime Timetable Images
Sally Line UK at Simplon Postcards

Defunct transport companies of Finland
Defunct shipping companies
Tanker shipping companies
1937 establishments in Finland
Transport companies established in 1937
Transport companies disestablished in 1990
1990 disestablishments in Finland